Penarth is a timber-framed house set back from the A483 road near to  Newtown, Wales, close to the banks of the river Severn. It is within  the parish of Llanllwchaiarn, within the historic county of Montgomeryshire, which now forms part of Powys. It is amongst the best examples of the ‘‘Severn Valley’’ timber-framed houses. The Penarth vinyard stands within the grounds of the house.

Architectural description
Penarth is a two storey  hall house with two forward projecting gabled wings. The two bayed construction of the hall with a central cruck truss  is likely to be the earliest part of the house and could be 15th century. It was originally suggested that it was an aisled hall, but restoration work in 1964 showed this was not the case. A chimney stack is positioned so that a Lobby entrance is formed, a typical feature of Severn Valley houses. The two gabled wings on either side of the hall are jettied with the second floor projecting forward and  the timber framing forming a  decorated geometric pattern.
.

History of Penarth
Penarth lies in Dyffryn Llanfair, an ancient township which lies to the south of the river Severn. The earliest known owner of Penarth was Richard Pryce, who in 1604 was commemorated in a poem by the Welsh Bard and Herald, Lewys Dwnn. Dwnn was  lived in nearby Bettws Cedewain. Penarth continued in the Pryce  family ownership and there are references to a later Richard Pryce in the Manorial records in 1696. In 1710 and 1717 an Edward Powell, Gent is mentioned as living at Penarth Ucha.   The Rev John Parker, (noted for his diaries and  drawings of Church screens), who was Rector of Llanmerewig (1827-1844), lived here. Mr and Mrs Higgs restored the house with grants from the Historic Buildings Council in 1964.

Wine production at Penarth
Bernard and Tanya Herbert planted their first vines in 1999, and the acreage was increased 2 years later, so that all 10 acres of vines are now bearing fruit. Varieties that are grown include German and French varieties such as Madeleine Angevine. However, the majority of the vines are the classical ‘sparkling wine grapes’- Pinot Noir, Pinot Meunier and Chardonnay. The vineyard has no winery, and wines are being produced by Three Choirs at Newent.

See also
Great Cefnyberen
Ty Mawr, Castle Caereinion 
Cilthriew, Kerry (Montgomeryshire)
Maesmawr Hall, Llandinam
Glas Hirfryn, Llansilin
Lymore, (Montgomery)
Trewern Hall

Bibliography
 Oliver H N Llanllwchaiarn Church and Parish 2000
 Pryce T E Half-Timbered Houses of Montgomeryshire, (Part III, Penarth), "Montgomeryshire Collections" Vol 17, 1884, 149–164, 359–368.
 Smith P and Vaughan-Owen C E Penarth, a Montgomeryshire Aisled Hall,  "Montgomeryshire Collections" Vol 58 pt ii, 1964, 107-113 
 Scourfield R and Haslam R  The Buildings of Wales: Powys; Montgomeryshire, Radnorshire and Breconshire. Yale University Press 2013
 Smith P Houses of the Welsh Countryside, 2nd Edition, 1988, HMSO/ RCAHMW
 Suggett R and Stevenson G Introducing Houses of the Welsh Countryside. Cyflwyno Cartrefi Cefn Gwlad Cymru. Y Lolfa/ RCAHMW, 2010

References

External links

Houses in Powys
Grade II* listed buildings in Powys
Timber-framed houses in Wales
Buildings and structures in Powys